João Infante was a Portuguese explorer of the African coast. He accompanied Bartolomeu Dias in his journey around the Cape of Good Hope in 1487/1488 by leading a second caravel, the São Pantaleão (named after Saint Pantaleon).

Some places in South Africa are or were named after him:
 The Rio do Infante, now the Great Fish River, Eastern Cape
 Cape Infanta, Western Cape
 Infanta, Western Cape: a small settlement

References

Portuguese explorers
15th-century explorers of Africa
Maritime history of Portugal
15th-century Portuguese people
South African explorers